Bobby Goepfert (born May 9, 1983) is an American professional ice hockey goaltender who is currently an unrestricted free agent who most recently played for Düsseldorfer EG in the Deutsche Eishockey Liga (DEL). He was selected by the Pittsburgh Penguins in the 6th round (171st overall) of the 2002 NHL Entry Draft.

Goepfert played with the Florida Everblades in the ECHL and the Charlotte Checkers in the American Hockey League (AHL) during the 2010-11 season; and the Hamburg Freezers in the Deutsche Eishockey Liga (DEL) during the 2009-10 season.

Awards and honors

References

External links

1983 births
Living people
American men's ice hockey goaltenders
Augusta Lynx players
Charlotte Checkers (2010–) players
DEG Metro Stars players
Düsseldorfer EG players
Florida Everblades players
Hamburg Freezers players
Hershey Bears players
Ice hockey players from New York (state)
People from Kings Park, New York
Pittsburgh Penguins draft picks
Portland Pirates players
Providence Friars men's ice hockey players
St. Cloud State Huskies men's ice hockey players
EC Red Bull Salzburg players
South Carolina Stingrays players
AHCA Division I men's ice hockey All-Americans